Alice Meyer was a backup outfielder who played in the All-American Girls Professional Baseball League. She batted and threw right handed.

Meyer spent a season with the South Bend Blue Sox in 1949 and appeared in 37 games. She hit a batting average of  .211 (19-for-90) with six runs scored and 13 RBI, including two triples and nine stolen bases.

The AAGPBL folded in 1954, but there is a permanent display at the Baseball Hall of Fame and Museum at Cooperstown, New York since November 5, 1988, that honors the entire league rather than any individual figure.

Sources

All-American Girls Professional Baseball League players
Baseball players from Chicago
Date of birth missing
Possibly living people
Year of birth missing